The Eyes of Annie Jones is a 1964 American-British drama film directed by Reginald Le Borg and starring Richard Conte, Francesca Annis and Joyce Carey. The film tells the story of a sleepwalking young woman involved with a murder.

The film was shot in Spain and financed by Robert L. Lippert.

Plot
Taxi driver Lucas murders wealthy Geraldine Wheeler, with whom he had been having an affair. The victim's Aunt Helen gets in touch with Geraldine's brother David and with Annie Jones, a 17-year-old girl from a nearby orphanage, who is said to have powers of extrasensory perception.

It turns out David has been embezzling from the family and hired Lucas to do the killing. A sleepwalking Annie seems to be possessed by the dead woman's spirit, saying things like, "They won't let me rest." When she approaches a spot where the body is buried, David has to prevent Lucas from killing the girl.

The two men have a falling out over money Lucas is still owed. The police become suspicious of him, and Lucas dies after crashing his speeding car. David is arrested, and the body and soul of Geraldine had not been allowed to rest, now found in the car's trunk.

Cast
 Richard Conte as David Wheeler
 Francesca Annis as Annie Jones
 Joyce Carey as Aunt Helen
 Myrtle Reed as Carol Wheeler
 Shay Gorman as Lucas
 Victor Brooks as Sergeant Henry
 Jean Lodge as Geraldine Wheeler
 Alan Haines as Constable Marlowe
 Mara Purcell as Orphanage Matron
 Mark Dignam as Orphanage Director
 Patricia McCarron as Miss Crossley
 Max Bacon as Publican Hoskins
 Barbara Leake as Margaret

Production
Robert L. Lippert tried to persuade Sophia Loren to play the lead.

Filming started in March 1963. It was shot in London.

References

External links
 
 
 
Review of film at New York Times
Eyes of Annie Jones at BFI

1964 films
1964 drama films
American drama films
British drama films
Films directed by Reginald Le Borg
20th Century Fox films
1960s English-language films
1960s American films
1960s British films